Jamar Johnson (born November 22, 1999) is an American football safety for the Arlington Renegades of the XFL. He played college football at Indiana. He was drafted by the Denver Broncos in the fifth round of the 2021 NFL Draft.

Early years
Johnson attended Riverview High School in Sarasota, Florida. As a senior he had 62 tackles, six interceptions, one sack and one touchdown. He committed to Indiana University to play college football.

College career
Johnson played at Indiana from 2018 to 2020. He spent his first two seasons as a backup before becoming a starter his junior year in 2020. After the 2020 season, he decided to forgo his senior season and enter the 2021 NFL Draft. He finished his career with 69 tackles, seven interceptions, four sacks and a touchdown.

Professional career

Johnson was drafted by the Denver Broncos in the fifth round, 164th overall, of the 2021 NFL Draft. He signed his four-year rookie contract on May 13, 2021. He was released on August 16, 2022.

Johnson signed with the Arlington Renegades of the XFL on March 7, 2023.

References

External links
Indiana Hoosiers bio

1999 births
Living people
Sportspeople from Sarasota, Florida
Players of American football from Florida
American football safeties
Indiana Hoosiers football players
Denver Broncos players
Riverview High School (Sarasota, Florida) alumni
Arlington Renegades players